Vladislav Lauda (born 25 January 1955) is a retired football striker.

During his club career, Lauda played for Slavia Prague, Sigma Olomouc and AEL Limassol. He also made 3 appearances for the Czech national team, scoring 1 goal.

External links
 

1955 births
Living people
Czech footballers
Czechoslovak footballers
Czechoslovakia international footballers
Czechoslovak expatriate footballers
Association football forwards
SK Slavia Prague players
SK Sigma Olomouc players
AEL Limassol players
Cypriot First Division players
Expatriate footballers in Cyprus
Czechoslovak expatriate sportspeople in Cyprus